Carry On Camping is a 1969 British comedy film, the 17th release in the series of 31 Carry On films (1958–1992). It features series regulars Sid James, Kenneth Williams, Charles Hawtrey, Joan Sims, Terry Scott, Hattie Jacques, Barbara Windsor, Bernard Bresslaw, Dilys Laye and Peter Butterworth.

Plot
Sid Boggle (Sid James) and his friend Bernie Lugg (Bernard Bresslaw) are partners in a plumbing business. They take their girlfriends, prudish Joan Fussey (Joan Sims) and meek Anthea Meeks (Dilys Laye), to the cinema to see a film about a nudist camp called Paradise. Sid has the idea of the group holidaying there, reasoning that in that environment their heretofore chaste girlfriends will relax their strict moral standards. Sid easily gains Bernie's co-operation in the scheme, which they attempt to keep secret from the girls.

They travel to the campsite named Paradise. After paying the membership fees to the owner, money-grabbing farmer Josh Fiddler (Peter Butterworth), Sid realises it is not the camp seen in the film, but merely a standard family campsite. To add to their disappointment, it is no paradise but instead, a damp field; the only facilities being a very basic toilet and a washing block. They reluctantly agree to stay there after Fiddler refuses a refund and the girls approve of the place. There is further disappointment when the girls will not share a tent with the boys.

Sid and Bernie soon set their sights on a bunch of young ladies on holiday from the Chayste Place finishing school. The ringleader of the girls is blonde and bouncy Babs (Barbara Windsor). In charge of the girls is Dr. Soaper (Kenneth Williams), who is fervently pursued by his lovelorn colleague, the school's matron, Miss Haggard (Hattie Jacques). The girls soon leave for Ballsworth Youth Hostel, where Babs and her friend Fanny (Sandra Caron) change the room numbers on Dr. Soaper's and Miss Haggard's doors and convince Dr. Soaper that the female washroom, where Miss Haggard is, is the male washroom. Dr Soaper leads an outdoor aerobics session, during which Babs' bikini top flies off; he catches it.

Other campers are Peter Potter (Terry Scott), who loathes camping but must endure his jolly yet domineering wife Harriet (Betty Marsden), with her irritating laugh, and naïve first-time camper Charlie Muggins (Charles Hawtrey).

Chaos ensues when a group of hippies arrive in the next field for a noisy all-night rave led by band The Flowerbuds. The campers club together and successfully drive the ravers away, but all the girls leave with them. However, there is a happy ending for Bernie and Sid when their girlfriends finally agree to move into their tent. Their joy is short-lived when Joan's mother (Amelia Bayntun) turns up, but Anthea lets loose a goat that chases Mrs Fussey away.  Meanwhile, Peter vows to Harriet that this camping holiday will most definitely be their last.

Cast

 Sid James as Sid Boggle
 Kenneth Williams as Doctor Kenneth Soaper
 Joan Sims as Joan Fussey
 Charles Hawtrey as Charlie Muggins
 Terry Scott as Peter Potter
 Barbara Windsor as Babs
 Bernard Bresslaw as Bernie Lugg
 Hattie Jacques as Miss Haggard/Matron
 Peter Butterworth as Joshua Fiddler
 Julian Holloway as Jim Tanner
 Dilys Laye as Anthea Meeks
 Betty Marsden as Harriet Potter
 Sandra Caron as Fanny
 Trisha Noble as Sally
 Amelia Bayntun as Mrs Fussey
 Brian Oulton as Mr Short, the camping store manager
 Patricia Franklin as Farmer's daughter
 Derek Francis as Farmer
 Michael Nightingale as Man in cinema
 George Moon as Man at campsite
 Walter Henry as Man in cinema
 Valerie Shute as Pat
 Elizabeth Knight as Jane
 Georgina Moon as Joy
 Vivien Lloyd as Verna
 Jennifer Pyle as Hilda
 Lesley Duff as Norma
 Jackie Pool as Betty
 Anna Karen as Hefty girl
 Sally Kemp as Girl with cow 
 Valerie Leon as Miss Dobbin, the camping store assistant
 Angela Grant as Schoolgirl (uncredited)
 Peter Cockburn as Film Commentator (uncredited)
 Gilly Grant as Sally G-string (uncredited)
 Michael Low as Lusty youth (uncredited)
 Mike Lucas as Lusty youth (uncredited)
 Alf Mangan as Camper (uncredited)
 David Seaforth as Camper (uncredited)

Crew
 Screenplay – Talbot Rothwell
 Music – Eric Rogers
 Production Manager – Jack Swinburne
 Art Director – Lionel Couch
 Editor – Alfred Roome
 Director of Photography – Ernest Steward
 Assistant Editor – Jack Gardner
 Camera Operator – James Bawden
 Assistant Director – Jack Causey
 Continuity – Doreen Dernley
 Sound Recordists – Bill Daniels & Ken Barker
 Make-up – Geoffrey Rodway
 Hairdresser – Stella Rivers
 Costume Designer – Yvonne Caffin
 Dubbing Editor – Colin Miller
 Title Sketches – Larry
 Producer – Peter Rogers
 Director – Gerald Thomas

Filming and locations
 Filming dates – 7 October–22 November 1968

Interiors:
 Pinewood Studios, Buckinghamshire

Exteriors:
 Pinewood Studios, Buckinghamshire. The studios' orchard doubled for Paradise Camp. Chayste Place school is the management block at Pinewood Studios, better known as Heatherden Hall and featured in Carry On Nurse, Carry On Up the Khyber, Carry On Again Doctor, Carry On at Your Convenience, Carry On Behind and Carry On England.
 Pinewood Green, Iver Heath housing estate, Buckinghamshire
 Everyman Cinema, Gerrards Cross, Buckinghamshire
 Maidenhead High Street
 Black Park, Buckinghamshire

Reception
The film was the most popular movie at the UK box office in 1969. It was voted the nation's favourite Carry On film in a survey conducted by the Daily Mirror in 2008.

Bibliography
 
 
 
 
 Keeping the British End Up: Four Decades of Saucy Cinema by Simon Sheridan (third edition) (2007) (Reynolds & Hearn Books)

References

External links
 
 
 Carry On Camping Location Guide at The Whippit Inn
 Carry on Camping at BFI Screenonline

1969 films
British comedy films
Carry On films
1969 comedy films
1960s English-language films
Films directed by Gerald Thomas
Films shot at Pinewood Studios
Films produced by Peter Rogers
Films with screenplays by Talbot Rothwell
Films about vacationing
1960s British films